The Iran Futsal's 1st Division (Persian: ليگ دسته یک فوتسال ایران) is the second-highest division overall in the Iranian futsal league system after the Super League.

League Champions 
2002–03: Rah Ahan
2003–04: Tam Iran Khodro
2004–05: Elmo Adab
2005–06: not held
2006–07: Felamingo - Shohada Zoghalsang
2007–08: Melli Haffari - Labaniyat Arjan
2008–09: Firooz Sofeh - Shahr Aftab
2009–10: Persepolis - Arash Beton
2010–11: Shahrdari Saveh - Misagh
2011–12: Shahrdari Tabriz - Gaz Khuzestan
2012–13: Giti Pasand Novin - Tasisat Daryaei
2013–14: Ferdosi - Moghavemat Alborz
2014–15: Kashi Nilou
2015–16: Labaniyat Arjan
2016–17: Moghavemat Qarchak
2017–18: Sunich
2018–19: Shahin
2019–20: Foodka
2020–21: Zandi Beton
2021–22: Gohar Zamin

See also 
 Iranian Futsal Super League
 Iran Futsal's 2nd Division
 IPL
 Azadegan League
 Iran Football's 2nd Division
 Iran Football's 3rd Division
 Iranian Super Cup
 Hazfi Cup

References

External links 
  I.R. Iran Football Federation

 
2
Professional sports leagues in Iran